Cai Shangjun is a Chinese film director and screenwriter. Cai graduated from the Central Academy of Drama in 1992. Since then, his major work has been that of a professional screenwriter. Cai was part of the team, along with Zhang Yang, Diao Yi'nan, and Liu Fendou, that co-wrote the screenplays for two of Zhang's films: Spicy Love Soup (1997) and Shower (1999). Cai also cowrote a script for Zhang's Sunflower (2005).

In 2007, Cai directed his first film, The Red Awn, which won the FIPRESCI Prize at the 2007 Pusan International Film Festival.

In 2011, Cai won the Silver Lion for the Best Director at the 68th Venice International Film Festival with the film People Mountain People Sea.

Filmography

As screenwriter

As director

References

External links

Cai Shangjun at the Chinese Movie Database

Film directors from Beijing
Living people
Central Academy of Drama alumni
Screenwriters from Beijing
Venice Best Director Silver Lion winners
1967 births
People's Republic of China writers